Monomorium pergandei is a species of ant in the genus Monomorium. It is native to the United States. The species is named after the American myrmecologist Theodore Pergande.

References

External links

Insects of the United States
pergandei
Hymenoptera of North America
Insects described in 1893
Taxonomy articles created by Polbot